The Museum of New Zealand Te Papa Tongarewa is New Zealand's national museum and is located in Wellington.  Usually known as Te Papa (Māori for 'the treasure box'), it opened in 1998 after the merging of the National Museum of New Zealand and the National Art Gallery. An average of more than 1.5 million people visit every year, making it the 26th-most-visited art gallery in the world.  Te Papa operates under a bicultural philosophy, and emphasises the living stories behind its cultural treasures.

History

Colonial Museum 
The first predecessor to Te Papa was the Colonial Museum, founded in 1865, with Sir James Hector as founding director. The museum was built on Museum Street, roughly in the location of the present day Defence House Office Building. The museum prioritised scientific collections but also acquired a range of other items, often by donation, including prints and paintings, ethnographic curiosities, and items of antiquity. In 1907, the Colonial Museum was renamed the Dominion Museum and took on a broader focus. The idea of developing a public art gallery in Wellington was gathering support, and the Science and Art Act of 1913 paved the way for a national art gallery in the same building.

Co-location with National Art Gallery 
Following the passing of the National Art Gallery and Dominion Museum Act in 1930, the two institutions shared a single board of trustees. In 1934, the National Art Gallery moved into the Dominion Museum building and incorporated the New Zealand Academy of Fine Arts, which sold its land and donated the proceeds to the new organisation together with an initial collection. The early holding consisted largely of donations and bequests, including those from Harold Beauchamp, T. Lindsay Buick, Archdeacon Smythe, N. Chevalier, J. C. Richmond, William Swainson, Bishop Monrad, John Ilott and Rex Nan Kivell. In 1936, a new building to house both the collections opened in Buckle Street as a part of the newly built National War Memorial. 

Eru D. Gore was secretary-manager from 1936 until his death in 1948 when Stewart Maclennan was appointed the first director. This was the first appointment in New Zealand of a full-time art gallery director. Other past directors of the gallery include:
Stewart Maclennan (1948–68)
Melvin Day (1968–78)
Luit Bieringa (1979–89)
Jenny Harper (1990–92)

Te Papa 
Te Papa was established in 1992 by the Museum of New Zealand Te Papa Tongarewa Act 1992. Part of the remit for Te Papa was to explore the national identity of New Zealand.  translates literally to 'container of treasures' or in full 'container of treasured things and people that spring from mother Earth here in New Zealand'. The official opening took place on 14 February 1998, in a ceremony led by Prime Minister Jenny Shipley, Sir Peter Blake, and two children. Māori traditional instrumentalist Richard Nunns co-led the musicians at a dawn ceremony on opening day. The museum had one million visitors in the first five months of operation, and between 1 and 1.3 million visits have been made in each subsequent year. In 2004, more space was devoted to exhibiting works from the New Zealand art collection in a long-term exhibition called Toi Te Papa: Art of the Nation. Filmmakers Gaylene Preston and Anna Cottrell documented the development of Te Papa in their film Getting to Our Place.

Current building 

The main Te Papa building is built on former Wellington Harbour Board land, on the waterfront in Wellington, on Cable Street. The site was previously occupied by a modern five-storey hotel. This was jacked off its foundations onto numerous rail bogies and transported  down and across the road to a new site, where it is now the Museum Hotel.

Te Papa was designed by Jasmax Architects and built by Fletcher Construction. The  building had cost NZ$300 million by its opening in 1998. Earthquake strengthening of the Cable Street building was achieved through the New Zealand-developed technology of base isolation. The building contains six floors of exhibitions, cafés and gift shops dedicated to New Zealand's culture, history and environment. The museum also incorporates outdoor areas with artificial caves, native bushes and wetlands. A second building on Tory Street is a scientific research facility and storage area, and is not open to the public.

The design process of the building followed bicultural principles based on the Treaty of Waitangi. This process was led by Cliff Whiting working alongside Cheryll Sotheran and Ken Gorbey.

Governance and leadership 
The museum is run by a board appointed by the Minister for Arts, Culture and Heritage. Board members have included: Wira Gardiner, Fiona Campbell, Sue Piper, Judith Tizard, John Judge, Miria Pomare, Michael Bassett, Christopher Parkin, Sandra Lee, Ngātata Love, Ron Trotter, Glenys Coughlan, Judith Binney, Philip Carter, Wendy Lai and Api Mahuika. 

CEOs of Te Papa include:

 Cheryll Sotheran (1992–2002)
 Cliff Whiting (1995–?) – joint CEO or kaihautū 
 Seddon Bennington (2003 – July 2009)
 Michael Houlihan (Aug 2010 – May 2014)
 Rick Ellis (Nov 2014 – May 2017)
 Geraint Martin (May 2017 – 2019)
 Courtney Johnston (2019–present) and Arapata Hakiwai (Kaihautū, Māori co-leader) (2014–present).

Collections
The History Collection includes many dresses and textiles, the oldest of which date back to the sixteenth century. The History Collection also includes the New Zealand Post Archive with around 20,000 stamps and related objects, and the Pacific Collection with about 13,000 historic and contemporary items from the Pacific Islands.

There are significant collections of fossils and archaeozoology; a herbarium of about 250,000 dried specimens (Index Herbariorum code WELT); a collection of about 70,000 specimen of New Zealand birds; significant amphibians, reptiles and mammals.

The museum has the world's largest specimen of the rare colossal squid (Mesonychoteuthis hamiltoni). The squid arrived at the museum in March 2007 after being captured by New Zealand fishers in the Ross Sea off Antarctica. The cultural collections include collections on photography, Māori taonga (cultural treasures), and Pacific cultures.

The Museum of New Zealand is also home to the Elgar Collection, a valuable collection of English and French furniture and paintings, the oldest of which date back to the seventeenth century. In 1946 the Dominion Museum received a bequest of some of Fernside Homestead’s finest antiques from Ella Elgar’s will. Until 1992 these antiques were displayed in period rooms at the Dominion Museum, and objects from the Elgar Collection are currently exhibited throughout Te Papa.

Archives
The archives are located in a separate building on 169 Tory Street and are open for researchers by appointment. There are two categories of archive collections: the Museum Archive and the Collected Archives.

The Museum Archive goes back to the founding of the Colonial Museum in 1865 and comprises the archives of James Hector. The archives of the National Art Gallery of New Zealand are also part of these archives. The Collected Archives fall into two groups:
 Art-related records and other archival papers in specialist areas; for instance the archives of Toss Woollaston, Lois White and Leonard Mitchell
 A wide variety of archival material, that includes the diary of Felton Mathew, Surveyor General at the time of the signing of the Treaty of Waitangi, and battle plans and correspondences related to World War I; for instance the Gallipoli diary of Captain E.P. Cox.

Exhibitions

Te Papa's exhibits range from long-term exhibitions on New Zealand's natural environment and social history, to cultural spaces and touring/temporary exhibitions. Most are hands-on and interactive. The long term exhibitions of cultural objects focus on New Zealand history, Māori culture and New Zealand's natural world. The hands-on and interactive exhibitions focus on engaging young visitors and include out-door areas built and planted for Te Papa. The key cultural space is the Rongomaraeroa marae with unusual whakairo in its wharenui, Te Hono ki Hawaiki.

All permanent exhibitions are free. Many of the temporary exhibitions are ticketed, but may have occasional free days.

In 2018, the Mountains to Sea and Awesome Forces exhibits were closed, with Te Taiao Nature taking their place. This new exhibit opened on 11 May 2019, with a 1,400 square-metre exhibition focusing on New Zealand's natural environment. The exhibition retains several features of the old exhibits, such as an earthquake house simulation and a 495 kilogram (1,091 lb) Colossal squid.

In 2022, the Manu Rere Moana exhibition was renewed to reflect the developments in traditional navigation since its initial installation. 

A full list of exhibitions can be found here.

Library
Te Aka Matua Library, previously a publicly accessible library, is now open only to researchers by appointment between 10am-5pm, Monday-Friday. The library is a major research and reference resource, with particular strengths in New Zealand, Māori, natural history, art, photography and museum studies. It is located on the fourth floor of the main building.

Mahuki Innovation Accelerator
Mahuki was Te Papa's innovation accelerator. It was an in-residence programme in which 10 teams developed solutions to challenges facing cultural institutions.

Controversies
The museum has sometimes been the centre of controversy. The siting of significant collections at the water's edge on reclaimed land next to one of the world's most active faults has resulted in concern by some people. There has been criticism of the "sideshow" nature of some exhibits, primarily the Time Warp section, which has closed. There has also been criticism that some exhibits were not given due reverence. For example, a major work by Colin McCahon was at one stage juxtaposed with a 1950s refrigerator in a New Zealand culture exhibition.

The Māori name of the museum has caused controversy. In 1989 the Māori iwi Te Āti Awa, located near Wellington, requested that the Ngāti Whakaue iwi grant a name to the museum, which resulted in the Ngāti Whakaue bestowing the name Kuru Tongarerewa, an ancient ceremonial name important to the iwi evoking spiritual, historical, and cultural importance. However, the name eventually adopted by the museum caused offense by being a modification in the form of Te Papa Tongarewa. Meetings between the museum's board and the Ngāti Whakaue led to promises that the name would be changed to Te Papa Kuru Tongererewa, however the change did not occur. 

New Zealand art commentator Hamish Keith has been a consistent critic of Te Papa at different times referring to it as a "theme park", the "cultural equivalent to a fast-food outlet" and "not even a de facto national gallery", but seemed to moderate his opinion later when making a case for exhibition space on the Auckland waterfront.

Staff restructuring at Te Papa since 2012 has generated significant controversy. In October 2018, Te Papa management promised to review restructuring plans, indicating that plans would be scaled back. In February 2019, the Collection Manager of Fishes Andrew Stewart and the Collection Manager of Molluscs Bruce Marshall were made redundant. Numerous museum experts and scientists in New Zealand and worldwide criticised the move, with researchers including Steve O'Shea advocating a boycott. In March 2019, the redundancies were delayed. In April 2019, the museum reversed the decision for Andrew Stewart, offering him an alternative job.  Between April and May 2019, Te Papa advertised a research position for a molluscan curator and awarded the job to an alternative candidate to Bruce Marshall. The advertisement and decision to not offer the job to Bruce Marshall was criticised harshly by outside experts, prompting moa expert Trevor Worthy to end his 30-year research association with the museum in protest.

On 23 June 2021, Te Papa Museum closed for two days for deep cleaning after an Australian tourist who visited the museum and its Surrealist Arts Masterpieces exhibit on 19 June tested positive for the SARS-CoV-2 Delta variant. In addition, 2,500 people who visited the museum around the same time were asked to go into self-isolation for between five and 14 days, depending on the part of the museum they were visiting.

Virgin Mary artwork controversy 

British artist Tania Kovats’ exhibition, Pictura Britannica, depicting the Virgin Mary in a condom, infuriated many in the Christian community and sparked protests and counter protests a month after Te Papa opened its doors in 1998. A nationwide petition was circulated calling for the work's removal. Protesters congregated on the forecourt outside, increasing in number after The Christian Action group took out a full-page advertisement in The Dominion newspaper inviting people to join their protest. They threatened to take Te Papa to court on the grounds of "blasphemous libel", a 1961 Crimes Act offence against "religion, morality and public welfare". Te Papa staff also became the target of abusive and threatening phone calls and letters. The exhibit was guarded after being physically attacked, and following that, a guard working at the site was assaulted.

Te Papa responded by refusing to remove the offending artwork. The museum welcomed protestors back, stating that the museum's aim was not to offend, but to stimulate debate as a forum. However, they stipulated that debate would not concern the removal of the artwork, but only its meanings and interpretation, claiming that, "the people of New Zealand would want the museum to take a strong position on this, not to succumb to intimidation as some other museums have". The move sought to align Te Papa with other art museums that have taken the side of artistic freedom in spite of well publicised protest (the statuette was banned in Adelaide, stolen in Sydney, and dropped from its British tour). Though ostensibly positioning itself as neutral space for debate, Te Papa's stand was nonetheless political. It communicated the institution's liberal credentials that associate secularism with institutional progressiveness.

The leader of the Christian Heritage Party claimed that the sacrilegious display of the statuette was hypocritical, given that the museum is careful not to offend sensitivities about Māori spirituality.

Behind the scenes tour advice for women 
Advice for pregnant and menstruating women to avoid a behind-the-scenes tour of some of Te Papa's collections in 2010 had some questioning if this was appropriate inclusiveness for a national museum. A Te Papa spokeswoman at the time said the policy was in place because of Māori beliefs surrounding the taonga collection included in the tour "for their own safety". This generated outrage, with claims that Te Papa was overbearing in terms of political correctness.

William Strutt painting dispute 
Taranaki tribal elders raised objections to a 19th-century Te Papa-owned painting that the museum planned to lend to the Govett-Brewster Art Gallery in New Plymouth in 2019. Te Papa said it hoped the piece, View of Mt Egmont, Taranaki, New Zealand, taken from New Plymouth, with Maoris driving off settlers' cattle, painted by William Strutt, would spark a conversation about historical perspectives.

Te Taiao water quality falsification 
In 2019, the museum faced criticism from farmers, and National Party MP Todd Muller over a container of brown dyed water which was part of a display in the museum's Te Taiao Nature exhibition. This water was labelled as "water from a typical farm stream" with an image of a cow defecating in a waterway, and was classed as undrinkable.  Te Papa spokeswoman Kate Camp also told Stuff that the bottles had been created for display purposes only and were not samples. Camp stated that, "this display is about telling the story of New Zealand waterways. It's based on robust research that shows that many waterways in New Zealand—in urban and rural areas—aren't fit to drink or to swim in".

Exposure of adult content to children 
In 2020, several children were exposed to mature content without sufficient warning messages. Te Papa head of art Charlotte Davy said the museum would be making warning signs more obvious and installing new ones.

See also
List of national galleries
Rongomaraeroa, the contemporary marae of Te Papa
 Tales from Te Papa, a television series about objects from the collection

References

Further reading 

 'The designing of Te Papa'. Architecture New Zealand. Special edition, February 1998.

External links
 
 Collections online
Te Papa within Google Arts & Culture

1992 establishments in New Zealand
1990s architecture in New Zealand
Art museums and galleries in New Zealand
Ethnographic museums in Australasia
Museums established in 1992
Museums in Wellington City
National museums of New Zealand
Natural history museums in New Zealand
New Zealand autonomous Crown entities
Wellington Central, Wellington